Carassioides argentea is a species of cyprinid fish in the genus Carassioides. It is found in Vietnam.

References 

Carassioides
Cyprinid fish of Asia
Fish of Vietnam
Fish described in 2001